Mélanie Laurent is a French  actress, singer, screenwriter and director. She initially rose to prominence for her performance in the 2006 French drama film Don't Worry, I'm Fine for which she later won the César Award for Most Promising Actress and the Prix Romy Schneider. Laurent further became known to international audiences for her starring role as Shosanna Dreyfus in Quentin Tarantino's Inglourious Basterds (2009), for which she won the Online Film Critics Society and the Austin Film Critics Association Award for Best Actress. She went on star in commercially successful Hollywood films including, the comedy drama Beginners (2011), and the caper film Now You See Me (2013), with the former earning her a nomination at the San Diego Film Critics Society Award for Best Supporting Actress.

Laurent's notable works include Dikkenek (2006), a Franco-Belgian comedy film for which she won Étoiles d'Or for Best Female Newcomer, French war film Days of Glory (2006),  Cédric Klapisch's Paris (2008) with an ensemble cast, The Round Up (2010), a French movie depicting the true story of a Jewish boy amidst the Vel' d'Hiv Roundup,  comedy drama Et soudain, tout le monde me manque (2011) which won her the Best Actress Award at the Newport Beach Film Festival , French-American nature documentary Wings of Life (2011) serving as narrator, Night Train to Lisbon (2013), Canadian-Spanish psycho thriller Enemy (2013; an adaptation of José Saramago's novel The Double), and drama film Aloft (2014). In addition she has acted in numerous other French movies receiving accolades including the Étoiles d'or du cinéma français (Gold Star of French Cinema).

In her first theater appearance Laurent teamed up with French theatre director Nicolas Bedos and shared the stage with actor Jérôme Kircher in 2010 for Promenade de santé. Apart from her acting career, she has also directed several French movies including short-films for X Femmes, a television series, and Respire, an adaptation of Anne-Sophie Brasme's novel of the same name that screened in the International Critics' Week section at the 2014 Cannes Film Festival. The latter won the Stockholm International Film Festival - Bronze Horse for Best Film. Laurent also directed the documentary film Demain, which won the César Award for Best Documentary Film and was also nominated for the Lumières Award for Best Documentary.

Filmography

As actress

As filmmaker

Theatre
 Promenade de santé by Nicolas Bedos (2010)

Footnotes

References

External links
 

Actress filmographies
Lists of awards received by French actor
French filmographies